Richard David Piñanez (born 29 August 1991) was a Paraguayan footballer.

References
 
 

1991 births
Living people
Paraguayan footballers
Paraguayan expatriate footballers
Independiente F.B.C. footballers
Puerto Montt footballers
Ñublense footballers
Primera B de Chile players
Chilean Primera División players
Segunda División Profesional de Chile players
Expatriate footballers in Chile
Association football forwards
Sportspeople from Ciudad del Este